Enrique Antônio Langue e Silvério de Bernoldi (born 19 October 1978) is a Brazilian professional racing driver who raced for the Arrows Formula One team in 2001 and 2002, and was the test driver for British American Racing (later Honda) between 2004 and 2006. He entered IndyCar racing in 2008, and competed in the FIA GT World Championship between 2009 and 2011, in addition to entering multiple other competitions.

Racing career

Early career
Bernoldi was born on 19 October 1978, in Curitiba, Paraná. He originally wanted to be a jockey because he liked horses but he received a go-kart from his parents as a gift for his seventh birthday. Bernoldi gained the inspiration to drive from watching fellow compatriots Nelson Piquet and Ayrton Senna. He began karting when he was nine years old, and he won multiple regional and national titles. Bernoldi won the Brazilian Paulista Kart Championship every year from 1989 to 1991 and claimed title honours in the Brazilian Kart Championship in 1990 and 1991. He went on to finish third at the 1992 Paulista Kart Championship in Brazil as well as placing third in the 1993 South American Kart Championship and fourth in the 1993 Pan-American Kart Championship. 

He travelled to Europe at age 16 to begin his car racing career. He entered the Formula Alfa Boxer series in Italy, where he finished fourth in his first race. Following a successful single entry in the Championnat de France Formule Renault, Bernoldi then entered the Eurocup Formula Renault 2.0 and won on his debut, the final round of the series. The following year he took in nine victories in eleven rounds and the title, before entering British Formula Three with the Promatecme team in 1997. Bernoldi was hospitalised after he was involved in a road traffic accident in January 1997 and required physiotherapy to recover in time for his F3 debut two months later. He took his first victory at Spa-Francorchamps en route to fifth in the championship, and also finished third at that year's Macau Grand Prix. Bernoldi remained with Promatecme for 1998 to take six more victories, and he was able to finish runner-up to compatriot Mario Haberfeld. He finished second at the 1998 Masters of Formula 3 and third at the 1998 Macau Grand Prix.

In 1999, Bernoldi progressed to the International Formula 3000 championship with the Red Bull Junior Team and drove the Lola T99/50-Zytek car. Although his debut season only resulted in two points accumulated in a single event out of a possible ten for 18th in the Drivers' Championship, he was retained by the team for the following year, finishing that season 16th in the points standings with five points scored in three of the ten rounds he raced. He was frequently fastest in late-year testing for the 2001 season and was the favourite to win that year's championship. Bernoldi would not participate in the series that year.

Due to the Red Bull Junior Team's links with Sauber, he tested for the Formula 1 team in both seasons, in addition to also testing for the Prost Grand Prix team in 2000. Although touted before the start of the 2001 season to be joining either Prost, Minardi, or Sauber, Bernoldi instead signed a three-year contract to drive for the Arrows squad with the option to extend his stay at the team for a further two years after his first season with them. He replaced the contracted Pedro de la Rosa because Bernoldi had provided Arrows with a budget.

Formula One

Driving the A22-Asiatech car during the 2001 season, Bernoldi performed respectably for the Arrows team, occasionally matching his more experienced teammate Jos Verstappen for pace in qualifying but performed less well than Verstappen during races. However, he gained notoriety for his efforts at the Monaco Grand Prix, where he held up the much faster McLaren car of David Coulthard for 35 laps; after a botched start, Coulthard had been fighting his way through the field, only to be stuck behind the Arrows, prompting irate responses from both Coulthard and McLaren team principal Ron Dennis. Bernoldi was defended by his team boss Tom Walkinshaw, who hit back at McLaren. He failed to score any points in 2001 due to the car's engine being unreliable and Bernoldi making driver errors, with 10 retirements from 17 starts, his highest finish being an eighth at the German Grand Prix. He did however improve his driving by the end of the season but did not contribute to improving the car's technical aspects. Bernoldi concluded the season without any scoring points in the World Drivers' Championship.

Even though Verstappen was the only Arrows driver to score points in 2001, Bernoldi was retained by Arrows for the 2002 championship, being partnered by Heinz-Harald Frentzen and drove one of the team's A23-Cosworth vehicles. At Sepang he notably overtook Michael Schumacher, having been passed by the German as he attempted to fight through the field after a first-lap incident with Juan Pablo Montoya, although his driving in that race was criticised by Allan McNish. Due to serious financial problems, Arrows were forced to withdraw three-quarters of the way into the 2002 season. Bernoldi thus again did not score any points in the World Drivers' Championship in the 11 races he entered. He subsequently switched to the World Series by Nissan to try and rebuild his reputation, after a potential drive for Jordan Grand Prix failed to materialise due to legal constraints.

2003–2007
In his debut season in the World Series by Nissan, Bernoldi finished sixth in the championship, having won two races. He also participated in a "mega test", held by Alfa Romeo, with a prospect of driving for the team in the 2004 European Touring Car Championship. Despite this test, he continued in the World Series in 2004, and finished third overall, with another pair of wins. In mid-2004 he was named a test driver for BAR, completing two tests at the Circuito de Jerez in Spain, in order to prevent the regular BAR drivers having to make several long-distance trips. He remained with the team after these sessions, also undertaking tests of BAR's "Concept Car" (a hybrid F1 car with a 2004 frontal setup mixed with a 2005 rear setup). He remained BAR's test driver for 2005, but began to look for pastures new in 2006, participating in less tests for the now-renamed Honda Racing F1 Team - although he did remain as official test driver. Although he impressed in Champ Car during a test for Rocketsports, his solitary race during 2006 came in Argentina's TC 2000 series. In 2007, Bernoldi competed in the Stock Car Brasil, competing in 11 of the 12 races and finishing 13th in the championship, with his best results being a pair of podium finishes.

IndyCar Series

For 2008 Bernoldi, signed a contract with Rocketsports for the 2008 Champ Car World Series. However, following the reunification of Champ Car and the Indy Racing League, Rocketsports withdrew, opting not to compete in the new, combined, series. It was later announced that Bernoldi would drive for Conquest Racing in the newly combined series' 2008 season. His best result was fourth, in the final Champ Car-sanctioned race at Long Beach. His best result in the reunified IndyCar Series was fifteenth at the 2008 Indianapolis 500. A collision with teammate Jamie Camara at Watkins Glen lead him to publicly criticize the team, and speculation that he might leave them. A thumb injury ruled him out of the final two races of the season, his seat being filled by Alex Tagliani.

2009–present
For 2009, Bernoldi was the full-time driver of Flamengo in the Superleague open wheel series and also he ran a partial schedule in Stock Car Brasil. He also competed in the FIA GT Championship for Sangari Team Brazil, taking his first win at Paul Ricard.

In 2010, he raced in the new FIA GT1 World Championship for Vitaphone Racing, scoring the pole position and winning his home race at Interlagos.

For 2011, he continued to race in the series, campaigning a Nissan GT-R for the Sumo Power GT team. He also entered four races of the GT Brasil, driving for Ford GT Racing Team BMG.

In 2012, he drove for Vita4One Team Italy in the Italian GT Championship, followed by appearances for AF Waltrip in the FIA World Endurance Championship, before making his debut in the International GT Open, driving once more for AF Corse in a Ferrari 458 GT2. He also made his debut in the SPEED EuroSeries, driving for Team JD in a Tatuus CN, whilst entering the 500 Milhas de Kart do Beto Carreiro at the end of the year. In 2013, he entered the International Challenge of the Stars, run by Felipe Massa.

Racing record

Career summary

Complete International Formula 3000 results
(key) (Races in bold indicate pole position; races in italics indicate fastest lap.)

Complete Formula One results
(key)

American open–wheel racing results
(key) (Races in bold indicate pole position)

IndyCar

 1 Run on same day.
 2 Non-points paying, exhibition race.

Indy 500 results

Superleague Formula
(Races in bold indicate pole position) (Races in italics indicate fastest lap)

Super Final Results

Complete GT1 World Championship results

Complete Stock Car Brasil results

† Ineligible for championship points.

References

External links

 
 IndyCar.com Profile

1978 births
Living people
Sportspeople from Curitiba
Brazilian racing drivers
Brazilian Formula One drivers
Arrows Formula One drivers
British Formula Three Championship drivers
IndyCar Series drivers
Brazilian IndyCar Series drivers
Indianapolis 500 drivers
Stock Car Brasil drivers
TC 2000 Championship drivers
International Formula 3000 drivers
Superleague Formula drivers
FIA GT1 World Championship drivers
FIA World Endurance Championship drivers
Formula Renault Eurocup drivers
Champ Car drivers
24 Hours of Spa drivers
AF Corse drivers
Michael Waltrip Racing drivers
French Formula Renault 2.0 drivers
JD Motorsport drivers
RSM Marko drivers
Conquest Racing drivers
RC Motorsport drivers
Alan Docking Racing drivers
Brazilian people of Italian descent
OAK Racing drivers